Branimir Aleksić (Serbian Cyrillic: Бранимир Алексић; born 24 December 1990) is a Serbian international football goalkeeper, who last played for Borac Čačak.

Club career
Aleksić came through the youth system at his hometown club Spartak Subotica. He made his senior debut for the club during the 2008–09 season after the club already merged with Zlatibor Voda. Aleksić made his Serbian SuperLiga debut in the 2009–10 season. He became the first choice goalkeeper after the departure of Milan Jovanić from the club, missing only one league match during the 2010–11 season. Aleksić made exactly the same amount of league games in the following two seasons.

International career
After making his debut in early 2011, Aleksić played regularly for the Serbian national under-21 team during the qualifications for the 2013 UEFA Under-21 Championship. He made his debut for the senior side in a friendly match against Sweden on 5 June 2012.

Career statistics

Club

International

References

External links
 
 Srbijafudbal profile
 

1990 births
Living people
Sportspeople from Subotica
Serbian footballers
Association football goalkeepers
Serbia international footballers
Serbia under-21 international footballers
FK Spartak Subotica players
AEL Kalloni F.C. players
FK Borac Čačak players
Szeged-Csanád Grosics Akadémia footballers
Mezőkövesdi SE footballers
Serbian SuperLiga players
Super League Greece players
Nemzeti Bajnokság II players
Serbian expatriate footballers
Expatriate footballers in Greece
Expatriate footballers in Hungary
Serbian expatriate sportspeople in Greece
Serbian expatriate sportspeople in Hungary